Tom Facey (born March 30, 1954) is an American politician from Missoula, Montana. A Democrat, he served in the Montana House of Representatives and the Montana Senate.  As of 2016 Facey has been the primary sponsor of 47 bills.

Facey served as a Minority Whip in the Senate during the 2015–2018 session.

In 2011, Facey was the primary sponsor of SB 276 intended to "generally revise deviate sexual conduct laws."  More specifically, the bill seeks to bring Montana in line with the Supreme Court ruling that "the law that criminalizes homosexual acts is unconstitutional." The bill was tabled in a House committee.

References

Living people
1954 births
Democratic Party Montana state senators
Politicians from Helena, Montana
Democratic Party members of the Montana House of Representatives
Politicians from Missoula, Montana
21st-century American politicians